The Garden District can refer to:

Place names
Canada
 Garden District, Toronto

United States
by state then city
Alexandria Garden District, Alexandria, Louisiana
Garden District (Montgomery, Alabama), listed on the NRHP in Alabama
 Garden District, DeLand, Florida
 Garden District, Baton Rouge, Louisiana
 Garden District, New Orleans, Louisiana

Theatre
 Garden District, (1958) the title of a double-bill of one-act plays by Tennessee Williams, set in New Orleans' Garden District, Suddenly Last Summer and Something Unspoken